Log flumes (colloquially known as log rides) are amusement rides consisting of a water flume and (artificial) hollow logs or boats. Passengers sit in the logs, which are propelled along the flume by the flow of water.

The ride usually culminates with a rapid descent and splashdown into a body of water, which may happen more than once (normally the largest drop being just before the end). It provides people with an entertaining way to get wet and cool off on a hot summer day, with certain seating sections usually being splashed with more water for a more fun and wet ride. Log flume rides are named for log flumes used in logging.

History 

Log flumes are a variant of the chute rides and old mill rides that were popular in the United States in the early 20th century. Shoot the Chute rides continue to be built today. Both of these types of rides took rather simple approaches to handling water flow. It was not until Karl Bacon of Arrow Development got involved and studied hydrodynamics that the use of water flow in an amusement ride was fully exploited.

The first modern day log flume amusement ride constructed by Arrow was El Aserradero at Six Flags Over Texas in Arlington, Texas, which opened in 1963 and is still in operation. The Mill Race, Arrow Log Flume number two, opened just a few weeks later at Cedar Point. Log flumes proved to be extremely popular and quickly became staples at amusement and theme parks throughout the world. The ride was so popular that some parks started adding second flume rides to help reduce the long lines. Cedar Point added Shoot the Rapids in 1967, and Six Flags Over Texas and Six Flags Over Georgia both added second flumes in 1968. When Six Flags Over Mid America opened in 1971, it featured twin flumes.

In the 1960s and early 1970s Arrow had a monopoly on the log flume business, producing over 50 flumes by 1979. In 1976, the French company Reverchon Industries started building flumes and in 1979 Hopkins Rides entered the flume building business. Other manufacturers eventually followed with Intamin building its first log flume in 1986 and Mack Rides in 1987.

Ride design 

Log flumes are generally out in the open, though some may contain enclosed or tunneled sections. The flume is usually made of fiberglass, concrete or galvanized steel. In a typical course, the boatful of riders floats through a small section of channel upon leaving the station, then engages a lift hill that takes them on a winding course in the water-filled trough. A second lifthill then culminates with an exciting drop and a splashdown finale. The amount of splash can be controlled by using rubber belting of differing widths and differing heights. To increase the chance of being soaked, the flume can be designed to be turbulent, or to run underneath waterfalls. Water cannons (typically coin-operated) aimed along the path are sometimes installed alongside the flume. Additionally, the exit path from the ride may cross over or go near to the flume, such that departing riders are drenched by the boat currently en route.

Notable flumes

One of the first elaborately-themed flumes was Timber Mountain Log Ride at Knott's Berry Farm. Originally built as a concession run by Hurlbut Amusement Company, most of the ride is inside a man-made mountain. Bud Hurlbut and his right-hand man Harry Suker were responsible for the theme of the ride. Upon his retirement, Hurlbut sold the ride to Knott's Berry Farm where it is still in operation.

Log Chute at Mall of America's indoor park Nickelodeon Universe contains sections within a large rocky structure and some out in the open.

Disney's Splash Mountain consists of a single trough running in a continuous circuit through the middle of a show building with Audio-Animatronic scenes playing on the left and right of the main flume, with only the largest drops and a few turns positioned placed outside the show building.
Luna Park's Wild River contains a few turns, then a lifthill which holds the riders (usually 4 or 5) upwards for 15 seconds then the log turns left and drops down. The second lifthill lifts up higher with audio playing in the back and then an exciting drop occurs and the riders return.

Dudley Do-Right's Ripsaw Falls is a popular log flume attraction heavily-themed around the animated character Dudley Do-Right. The ride was manufactured by Mack Rides and is located at Universal's Islands of Adventure. It features multiple smaller drops before a 75-foot drop at the end. In addition, the ride is one of the few of its kind to use lap bars as a method of restraining riders.

Manufacturers
 ABC Rides
 Arrow Dynamics
 Barr Engineering
 Bear Rides
 Big Country Motioneering
 D.P.V. Rides
 Fabbri Group
 Hafema
 Hopkins Rides
 I.E Park
 Intamin
 Interlink
 L&T Systems
 Mack Rides
 Mimafab
 Preston & Barbieri
 Reverchon Industries
 Rides and Fun
 SBF Visa Group
 Schwarzkopf
 Senyo Kogyo
 Soquet
 Technical Park
 Van Egdom
 Venture Rides
 WGH Transportation Engineering
 Zamperla

Installations

See also 
 Old Mill (ride)
 Log flume

References 

Water rides